Mariana Paola Vicente Morales (born January 8, 1989) is a Puerto Rican actress, model and beauty pageant titleholder who was crowned Miss Universe Puerto Rico 2010 and placed in the Top 10 at the 2010 Miss Universe pageant held in Las Vegas, Nevada.

Biography
Vicente is the oldest of four children, Ramón, Claudia Sofia and Sebastián. Her father, Ramón Vicente, is a businessman and her mother, Izayma Morales, works in public relations. She is married to Major League Baseball player Kiké Hernández.

Miss Universe Puerto Rico 2010
Vicente represented Rio Grande at the Miss Universe Puerto Rico 2010 pageant, held on November 12, 2009 in San Juan, where she won several awards including: L'Bel Face, JcPenney Best Style, Holsum Light Best Figure and Payless Best Catwalk, gaining the right to represent Puerto Rico in Miss Universe 2010, broadcast live from Las Vegas, Nevada on August 23, 2010 where she placed in the top 10. She was the fourth blonde woman to represent Puerto Rico at Miss Universe after Ada Perkins in 1978, Laurie Simpson in 1987 and Uma Blasini in 2007. She is represented by Element Model Management in Puerto Rico, directed by Ann La Place.

Filmography

Film

Television

Music videos

References

External links

Official Mariana Vicente website
Official Miss Universe Puerto Rico website

Mariana's Blog website

1989 births
Living people
Actresses from San Juan, Puerto Rico
Puerto Rican film actresses
Puerto Rican television actresses
Puerto Rican people of Spanish descent
Miss Puerto Rico winners
Miss Universe 2010 contestants
Puerto Rican beauty pageant winners